The  is a species of flying squirrel, one of the giant flying squirrels in the genus Petaurista.

Description
Like other flying squirrels, it has a web of skin between its legs which it uses to glide between trees. Glides of 160 metres have been recorded. The tail is used for stability during flight. The body is about 25–50 cm long, and the tail a further 30–40 cm. It weighs between 700 and 1500g. It is much larger than the related Japanese dwarf flying squirrel which does not exceed 220g. It eats fruit and nuts and lives in holes in large trees. The female has a home range of about a hectare and the male about two hectares.

Distribution and habitat
It is native to Japan, where it inhabits sub-alpine forests and boreal evergreen forests on the islands of Honshu, Shikoku and Kyushu.

Reproduction
Sexual maturity is reached after about two years. From winter to early summer the males compete for females. During mating, after ejaculation, the male produces a sticky protein called a coitus plug from his penis which becomes firm and blocks the female's vagina. This may stop semen from leaking out and heighten the chances of fertilization. It also prevents other males from mating with the same female. However males can use their penis to remove the coitus plug.
Gestation lasts about 74 days and one or two young are born in early autumn.

References

Petaurista
Mammals described in 1844
Endemic fauna of Japan
Mammals of Japan